Bourcier is a French surname. Notable persons with that surname include:

Conrad Bourcier (1915–1987), Canadian ice hockey player
François Antoine Louis Bourcier (1760–1828), French cavalry officer
Jean Bourcier (1911–1989), Canadian ice hockey player
John P. Bourcier (1927–2002), Justice of the Rhode Island Supreme Court
Jules Bourcier (1797–1873), French naturalist

French-language surnames